The 1968–69 Boston Celtics season was their 23rd season of the Boston Celtics in the National Basketball Association. The Celtics won their 11th championship and that was Bill Russell's final season. The Celtics had the best team defensive rating and the tenth best team offensive rating in the NBA.

Draft picks

This table only displays picks through the second round.

Roster

Regular season

Season standings

Record vs. opponents

Game log

Playoffs

|- align="center" bgcolor="#ccffcc"
| 1
| March 26
| @ Philadelphia
| W 114–100
| John Havlicek (35)
| Bill Russell (15)
| Bill Russell (8)
| Spectrum8,151
| 1–0
|- align="center" bgcolor="#ccffcc"
| 2
| March 28
| Philadelphia
| W 134–103
| Bailey Howell (29)
| Howell, Russell (16)
| John Havlicek (7)
| Boston Garden13,751
| 2–0
|- align="center" bgcolor="#ccffcc"
| 3
| March 30
| @ Philadelphia
| W 125–118
| Sam Jones (28)
| Bill Russell (18)
| John Havlicek (10)
| Spectrum15,244
| 3–0
|- align="center" bgcolor="#ffcccc"
| 4
| April 1
| Philadelphia
| L 116–119
| John Havlicek (28)
| Bill Russell (29)
| Bill Russell (5)
| Boston Garden14,017
| 3–1
|- align="center" bgcolor="#ccffcc"
| 5
| April 4
| @ Philadelphia
| W 93–90
| John Havlicek (22)
| Bill Russell (18)
| Bill Russell (6)
| Spectrum15,244
| 4–1
|-

|- align="center" bgcolor="#ccffcc"
| 1
| April 6
| @ New York
| W 108–100
| John Havlicek (25)
| Bill Russell (16)
| Em Bryant (8)
| Madison Square Garden19,500
| 1–0
|- align="center" bgcolor="#ccffcc"
| 2
| April 9
| New York
| W 112–97
| Bailey Howell (27)
| Bill Russell (29)
| John Havlicek (12)
| Boston Garden14,933
| 2–0
|- align="center" bgcolor="#ffcccc"
| 3
| April 10
| @ New York
| L 91–101
| Russell, Bryant (16)
| Bill Russell (20)
| Russell, Havlicek (8)
| Madison Square Garden19,500
| 2–1
|- align="center" bgcolor="#ccffcc"
| 4
| April 13
| New York
| W 97–96
| Bill Russell (21)
| Bill Russell (23)
| John Havlicek (4)
| Boston Garden13,506
| 3–1
|- align="center" bgcolor="#ffcccc"
| 5
| April 14
| @ New York
| L 104–112
| John Havlicek (29)
| Bill Russell (16)
| John Havlicek (7)
| Madison Square Garden19,500
| 3–2
|- align="center" bgcolor="#ccffcc"
| 6
| April 18
| New York
| W 106–105
| Sam Jones (29)
| Bill Russell (21)
| Russell, Havlicek (5)
| Boston Garden14,933
| 4–2
|-

|- align="center" bgcolor="#ffcccc"
| 1
| April 23
| @ Los Angeles
| L 118–120
| John Havlicek (37)
| Bill Russell (27)
| Sam Jones (6)
| The Forum17,554
| 0–1
|- align="center" bgcolor="#ffcccc"
| 2
| April 25
| @ Los Angeles
| L 112–118
| John Havlicek (43)
| Bill Russell (21)
| Bill Russell (13)
| The Forum17,559
| 0–2
|- align="center" bgcolor="#ccffcc"
| 3
| April 27
| Los Angeles
| W 111–105
| John Havlicek (34)
| Bill Russell (18)
| John Havlicek (7)
| Boston Garden14,037
| 1–2
|- align="center" bgcolor="#ccffcc"
| 4
| April 29
| Los Angeles
| W 89–88
| John Havlicek (21)
| Bill Russell (29)
| five players tied (2)
| Boston Garden15,128
| 2–2
|- align="center" bgcolor="#ffcccc"
| 5
| May 1
| @ Los Angeles
| L 104–117
| Sam Jones (25)
| John Havlicek (14)
| Russell, Havlicek (5)
| The Forum17,553
| 2–3
|- align="center" bgcolor="#ccffcc"
| 6
| May 3
| Los Angeles
| W 99–90
| Don Nelson (25)
| Bill Russell (19)
| Em Bryant (5)
| Boston Garden15,128
| 3–3
|- align="center" bgcolor="#ccffcc"
| 7
| May 5
| @ Los Angeles
| W 108–106
| John Havlicek (26)
| Bill Russell (21)
| Bill Russell (6)
| The Forum17,568
| 4–3
|-

Awards, records and milestones

Awards
John Havlicek, All-NBA Second Team
Bill Russell, NBA All-Defensive First Team
Satch Sanders, NBA All-Defensive Second Team
John Havlicek, NBA All-Defensive Second Team

References

 Celtics on Database Basketball
 Celtics on Basketball Reference

Boston Celtics
Boston Celtics seasons
NBA championship seasons
Boston Celtics
Boston Celtics
1960s in Boston